Jarząb  is a village in the administrative district of Gmina Radoszyce, within Końskie County, Świętokrzyskie Voivodeship, in south-central Poland.

References

Villages in Końskie County